Some Velvet Sidewalk was an experimental lo-fi rock band from Olympia, WA on the independent label K Records.

History
Some Velvet Sidewalk was formed in Eugene, Oregon in 1987 by Al Larsen (vocals/guitar) and Robert Christie (drums). Their first release was From Playground 'Til Now, and was independently released on cassette in 1988. Somewhere around this time, Jenny Olay joined on second guitar and went on the band's first American jaunt with the Go Team, Rich Jensen, Spook & The Zombies, and Mecca Normal. In 1990, Larsen along with Tobi Vail (drums) and Louise Olsen (bass) recorded the album, Shipwreck. (The release of this album was heavily delayed, but it was eventually released in 1995.) Just before the 1990 release of their first full album, Appetite For Extinction, Robert Christie left the band and was replaced by Don Blair and bass player Martin Bernier, whom Larsen had found in a free musician's wanted ad.

A short tour of small Pacific NW towns quickly followed with D.C. band Scream, of which Dave Grohl was a member and it was Some Velvet Sidewalk that accompanied Scream when Kurt Cobain first met Grohl at a small party at Slim Moon's home.

This new line-up soon recorded with Calvin Johnson in Yo Yo Studios along with Pat Maley what would become known as the "Pumpkin Patch" single.

They went back to the studio in 1991 with producer and musician Steve Fisk to record Avalanche, which released in 1992. They spent 1992 and 1993 touring and released a short EP called I Scream.  Following suit, the next album, Whirlpool, showed up in 1994. Ryan Baldoz of Olympia joined on second guitar around this time.

SVS soon added keyboardist Paul Schuster to the lineup to record the 1997 album, Generate!. The final true SVS release, the EP The Lowdown, was released in late 1997.

The band broke up following an American tour, and the members went their separate ways. In 1999, Larsen compiled and released a posthumous SVS album called Original Love Rock Masters. This album is a compilation that contains live songs, garage demos, and various side projects.

Crayon and the Pastels have recorded and released cover versions of Some Velvet Sidewalk songs.

Al Larsen continued his musical career with bands such as the Polar Bears, the Evil Tambourines and Melting Igloo. In 2005, he released a solo album titled The Hardline According to Danny & the Dinosaur on his own label, Property Is Theft. Larsen is now an assistant professor and Coordinator of Creative Media at Champlain College. Martin Bernier joined Seattle's the Heroic Trio, which featured Australian ex-pat and future Welcome bassist Jo Klaxton and drummer Lenni Rennals. They released one full-length album and one three-songsong EP on La Push Records. Following Bernier's exit from that band he joined Olympia's Bunnyfoot Charm. Don Blair went on to play drums in Totfinder along with ex-Sleep Capsule member Russ Klatt. He now plays in the experimental Waves.

The original drummer and founding member, Robert Christie, was killed in a car accident February  2001 along with his wife, Denise and two sons, Ted and John.

Band members
Al Larsen - Vocals & Guitar
Robert Christie - Drums (1987–1989)
Jenny Olay - Guitar & Vocals (1988-1990)
Tobi Vail - Drums (1990)
Don Blair - Drums (1990–1997)
Louise Olsen - Bass (1990)
Martin Bernier - Bass (1990–1997)
Ryan Baldoz - 2nd Guitar (1994–1995)
Paul Schuster - Keyboard (1996–1997)

Discography

Albums
 From Playground 'Til Now (1988)
 Appetite For Extinction (1990)
 Avalanche (1992)
 Whirlpool (1994)
 Shipwreck (1995)
 Generate! (1997)
 Original Love Rock Masters (1999)

EPs
 I Scream (EP) (1993)
 The Lowdown (EP) (1997)

Singles
 I Know (single) (1988)
 Land and Earthbound (single) (1989)
 Pumpkin Patch (single) (1991)
 Eyes Like Yours (single) (1992)
 Free from It (single) (1994)
 Valley of the Clock (single) (1997)

Compilation appearances
 Throw: The Yoyo Studio Compilation (1991)
 Kill Rock Stars (1991)
 International Pop Underground Convention (1992)
 International Hip Swing'' (1993)

References

External links
Official website
Fan Page
Property is Theft Site
MySpace Page

K Records artists
Musical groups from Olympia, Washington
Musical groups from Eugene, Oregon
Musical groups established in 1987
Musical groups disestablished in 1997
1987 establishments in Oregon